Locust Dale is an unincorporated community in Madison County, Virginia, United States.

Locust Hill was listed on the National Register of Historic Places in 2002.

References

Unincorporated communities in Madison County, Virginia
Unincorporated communities in Virginia